Situs inversus (also called situs transversus or oppositus) is a congenital condition in which the major visceral organs are reversed or mirrored from their normal positions. Several fictional characters have reversed organs.

 In the Ian Fleming novel Dr. No, the eponymous villain Julius No explains that he once survived a certain death by execution as his heart is located on his right side, which his would-be-assassin did not know when he fired at No’s heart at point-blank range. No, already near death from torture and mutilation, survives and the event helps nurture a god complex and seeing himself as exceptional. 
 At the DC Comics Universe, all the inhabitants of Earth 3 have their organs in an inverse position, and is possible to identify them in this way.
 Souther, from the manga Fist of the North Star, has dextrocardia with situs inversus totalis, making him immune to the normal applications of Kenshiro's Hokuto Shinken fighting style, since Souther's organs—and thus, his pressure points—are reversed from where they would normally be. This highly advantageous condition is referred to by Souther as his 'Emperor's Armour', and in his first fight with Kenshiro, he uses this advantage to easily defeat his opponent. During their final confrontation, Kenshiro uncovers the secret to Souther's body, allowing him to hold his own and ultimately defeat Souther in a decisive final battle.
 In an episode of the television show In Plain Sight, an ATF agent survives an attempt on his life because his heart is on the right side of his body.
 In the WB series Jack & Jill, Simon Rex played a young man with situs inversus.
 Fortune, from Metal Gear Solid 2: Sons of Liberty. Revolver Ocelot points this out when he shoots Fortune on the left side of her chest, then remembers and states that her heart was on the right side.
 In an ER episode entitled "Freak Show", Romano, Benton and Corday operate on a unique case involving a boy with reversed organs.
In a story called The Trap, which H. P. Lovecraft helped write, one of the characters is sucked into an interdimensional rift by an antique mirror. When he returns, his organs and his handedness (which hand is dominant) are both reversed.
 In Margaret Mahy's novel The Tricksters, the character Hadfield is said to be an exact mirror image of his otherwise identical twin Felix, including having his vital organs in mirror-image layout.
 In the Lord Peter Wimsey short story The Image in the Mirror by Dorothy Sayers, a character with reversed organs has long been haunted by dreams of a doppelgänger and by fears that he himself might be only the reflection of someone else.
 In the A. E. van Vogt short story The Search, the unique trait of people who can travel through time is that they have reversed internal organs.
 In the Max Brooks novel World War Z, a character describes operating on a patient who had dextrocardia with situs inversus, and transplants a heart from someone with the same condition.  Unbeknownst to him, the transplant heart is infected with the virus Solanum, thus turning the patient into a zombie.
 In the science fiction novel Doorways in the Sand by Roger Zelazny the character Fred Cassidy goes through a device that completely reverses the left-right symmetry of his entire body (even to the point where he perceives writing and other images as their mirror image). The fact that his heart is on the wrong side ends up saving him from being killed by a bullet wound.
 In the science fiction short story Technical Error by Arthur C. Clarke, character Richard Nelson is inverted laterally in an industrial accident where his body exists in a fourth spatial dimension due to a short circuit at the power plant where he works, which caused a strong, but unstable magnetic field.  Doctors find he is unable to digest food due to the nutrient molecules being incompatible with his reversed enzymes and receptors.  Efforts to re-invert him prove catastrophic.
 In the Hindi movie Luck (2009), the character 'Ram' has his heart on the right side instead of the left which saves his life.
In the Bengali detective novel Shajarur Kanta (Porcupine's Quill), featuring detective Byomkesh Bakshi, a character survives a stab wound to the chest because his heart is located on the right side, a fact unknown to his assailant.
 In Audrey Niffenegger's novel, Her Fearful Symmetry, the main characters are mirror twins, one of whom, Valentina, has situs inversus.
 In the movie Ninja Assassin, a Europol agent Mika gets stabbed where her heart should be. Everyone thinks her to be dead, but then Raizo proclaims that her heart is "special" (meaning on the right side instead of left), and she survives. Also, in the beginning of the movie there is an old man, a tattoo artist, who should have died 57 years ago from a sword to the heart, but survived because his heart was located on the right side of the body as well.
In 2008 horror movie The Broken protagonist Gina McVey, a radiologist, is seen discussing a patient with Dextrocardia situs inversus early in the film.
In Roll Call - book 3 of the series Traces, a character called Emily Wonder has the condition.
In the manga Black Jack, the protagonist has a patient who has situs inversus totalis, in which he operates using a mirror that Pinoko provided so that he can see the organs "normally".
 Helena from the series Orphan Black was discovered to have situs inversus totalis after surviving a gunshot wound that would otherwise have pierced her heart.
 In Doppelgänger (1969 film) (also known as Journey to the Far Side of the Sun) astronauts from Earth land on a parallel planet on the other side of the Sun where everything is a mirror image of what it is on Earth. When one of the astronauts dies, X-rays from his post-mortem exam reveal that his internal organs are located on the wrong side of his body. 
 De Rode Ridder, the main character of the eponymous Flemish comic has situs inversus after he passed through a magical mirror (album 58), which later on saves his life by making a crossbow bolt narrowly miss his heart (album 208).
 In the aptly titled mission in the 2016 game Hitman, Agent 47 must assassinate Erich Soders, who is afflicted with Situs Inversus and sold out his employer, the International Contract Agency, to secure a heart transplant at a confidential Japanese hospital. A possible alternative to directly killing him is to destroy his replacement heart, leaving him on the operating table without a viable replacement. This mission also references the rarity of finding a right sided donor heart by hinting that an illegal black market organ trade occurred to obtain a right sided heart from a homeless Brazilian boy.
 In the H. G. Wells' short story The Plattner Story, the protagonist, Gottfried Plattner, experiences an explosive chemical accident that has the result of reversing his body, after traversing through an alternate dimension.

Situs inversus